West Prince was a federal electoral district in Prince Edward Island, Canada, that was represented in the House of Commons of Canada from 1896 to 1904.

This riding was created in 1892 from parts of Prince County ridings.

It was abolished in 1903 when it was redistributed into Prince and Queen's ridings.

It consisted of the western part of Prince County.

Election results

By-election: On election being declared void, 24 March 1897

By-election: On Mr. Perry's death, 24 February 1898

See also 

 List of Canadian federal electoral districts
 Past Canadian electoral districts

External links 
Riding history for West Prince (1892–1903) from the Library of Parliament

Former federal electoral districts of Prince Edward Island